The computer tool patch is a Unix program that updates text files according to instructions contained in a separate file, called a patch file. The patch file (also called a patch for short) is a text file that consists of a list of differences and is produced by running the related diff program with the original and updated file as arguments. Updating files with patch is often referred to as applying the patch or simply patching the files.

History
The original patch program was written by Larry Wall (who went on to create the Perl programming language) and posted to mod.sources (which later became comp.sources.unix) in May 1985. A variant of the program (but not the only one) is part of the GNU project and is maintained by the FSF.

Usage context
Developed by a programmer for other programmers, patch was frequently used for updating source code to a newer version. Because of this, many people came to associate patches with source code, whereas patches can in fact be applied to any text. Patched files do not accumulate any unneeded text, which is what some people perceive based on the English meaning of the word; patch is as capable of removing text as it is of adding it. 

Patches described here should not be confused with binary patches, which, although can be conceptually similar, are distributed to update binary files comprising the program to a new release.

Patches in software development
The diff files that serve as input to patch are readable text files, which means that they can be easily reviewed or modified by humans before use.

In addition to the "diff" program, diffs can also be produced by other programs, such as Subversion, CVS, RCS, Mercurial and Git.

Patches have been the crucial component of many source control systems, including CVS.

Advanced diffs

When more advanced diffs are used, patches can be applied even to files that have been modified in the meantime, as long as those modifications do not interfere with the patch. This is achieved by using "context diffs" and "unified diffs" (also known as "unidiffs"), which surround each change with context, which is the text immediately before and after the changed part.  Patch can then use this context to locate the region to be patched even if it has been displaced by changes earlier in the file, using the line numbers in the diffs as a starting point.  Because of this property, context and unified diffs are the preferred form of patches for submission to many software projects.

The above features make diff and patch especially popular for exchanging modifications to open-source software. Outsiders can download the latest publicly available source code, make modifications to it, and send them, in diff form, to the development team. Using diffs, the development team has the ability to effectively review the patches before applying them, and can apply them to a newer code base than the one the outside developer had access to.

Usage examples
To create a patch, one could run the following command in a shell:
$ diff -u oldFile newFile > mods.diff  # -u tells diff to output unified diff format
To apply a patch, one could run the following command in a shell:

$ patch < mods.diff

This tells patch to apply the changes to the specified files described in mods.diff. Patches to files in subdirectories require the additional -pnumber option, where number is 1 if the base directory of the source tree is included in the diff, and 0 otherwise.

Patches can be undone, or reversed, with the '-R' option:

$ patch -R < mods.diff

In some cases when the file is not identical to the version the diff was generated against, the patch will not be able to be applied cleanly.  For example, if lines of text are inserted at the beginning, the line numbers referred to in the patch will be incorrect.  patch is able to recover from this, by looking at nearby lines to relocate the text to be patched.  It will also recover when lines of context (for context and unified diffs) are altered; this is described as fuzz.

Ports of patch
Originally written for Unix and Unix-like systems, patch has also been ported to Windows and many other platforms. Windows ports of patch are provided by GnuWin32 and UnxUtils.

A patch command is also part of ASCII's MSX-DOS2 Tools for MSX-DOS version 2.

See also
 Patch (computing)
 Quilt (software)
 rsync
 xdelta
 List of Unix commands
 IBM Mainframe utility IEBUPDTE a mainframe patch program, created about 20 years earlier (circa ~1964).

References

External links

GNU Diffutils (includes diff and patch); Documentation
GNU tools for Win32Win32 port of tools, including diff and patch
 

1984 software
Unix SUS2008 utilities
Plan 9 commands
Patch utilities